Focht is a surname. Notable people with the surname include:

Benjamin K. Focht (1863–1937), Republican member of the U.S. House of Representatives from Pennsylvania
Dan Focht (born 1977), Canadian ice hockey defencemen
Ivan Focht (1927–1992), Croatian and Bosnian Jewish philosopher and mycologist
James Focht McClure Jr. (1931–2010), Judge of the United States District Court for the Middle District of Pennsylvania
Matt Focht, American musician originally from Omaha, Nebraska

See also
Focht Hill, a low mountain in Northampton County, Pennsylvania

References